John Steele (died spring 1762) was a surgeon and political figure in Nova Scotia.

He came to Halifax with Edward Cornwallis in 1749 and moved to Annapolis around 1759, where he set up practice. It is recorded that, in 1752, Steele had several children over the age of sixteen. In 1761, he was named a justice of the peace for Annapolis County.

He represented Annapolis County in the 3rd General Assembly of Nova Scotia from 1761 to 1762.  His seat was declared vacant on May 4, 1762 due to his death.

References 

 

Year of birth missing
Nova Scotia pre-Confederation MLAs